South Korean singer-songwriter Roy Kim has released three studio albums, 10 singles (including three collaborative songs), and 19 music videos. He has additionally released four soundtracks for television series. Since his first appearance on Mnet's talent competition series Superstar K4, the artist has sold over 12 million digital downloads in South Korea.

Before his debut in 2012, Kim applied for Superstar K4. Six of his cover songs were released during the competition, one of which ("Becoming Dust") topped both the Gaon Digital Chart and the now-defunct Billboard Korea K-Pop Hot 100. Kim was crowned the final winner of the show, with his self-written song "Passing By".

Kim's debut single "Bom Bom Bom" became a major hit in the artist's native country, debuting at number one on the Gaon Digital Chart. It eventually remained one of the most successful singles of 2013 in South Korea, with over 1.5 million digital sales according to the Gaon Music Chart. The song was later included on Kim's first full-length album, Love Love Love (2013), which spawned a top-five hit of the same title. Kim also participated in the soundtrack for Reply 1994 ("Seoul, Here") that year.

Home (2014), the artist's second studio album, produced a top-five hit of the same name. Following his soundtrack contribution in Pinocchio ("Pinocchio"), Kim released a holiday song called "It's Christmas Day" at the end of the year.

In July 2015, the single "The Way to Meet You" was released as a duo with a female vocalist, for the first time since Kim's debut. It served as a campaign song for mobile puzzle game Pet Rescue Saga. In September, Kim recorded the song "Do Not Love Me" for the soundtrack to Twenty Again. The artist's third studio album, The Great Dipper (2015), was released at the end of that year, spawning an eponymous top-30 single. Kim also collaborated with veteran singer-songwriter Lee Moon-se and Hanhae from hip-hop trio Phantom, on the holiday single "This Christmas".

In 2016, Kim contributed the song "Maybe I" to the soundtrack to Another Oh Hae-young. He also released a cover version of Stefanie Sun's hit song "Cloudy Day", as the first Korean singer to cover a Taiwanese hit in Chinese.

Studio albums

Extended plays

Singles

As lead artist

Collaborations

Soundtrack appearances

Other appearances

Other charted songs

Videography

Music videos

Footnotes

References

External links
  

Discographies of South Korean artists
Folk music discographies
Pop music discographies